Taneli is a Finnish masculine given name and surname and may refer to:

As a given name:
Taneli Jarva (born 1975), Finnish musician (Sentenced, The Black League) and tattoo artist
Taneli Kuusisto (1905–1988), Finnish composer, music critic, teacher and choir leader
Taneli Mäkelä (born 1959), Finnish actor and writer 
Taneli Mustonen (born 1978), Finnish film director
Taneli Nykänen (1845–1927), was a Finnish politician and farmer 
Taneli Siikaluoma (born 1994), Finnish ice hockey player
Taneli Tikka (born 1978), Finnish technology entrepreneur
Taneli Typpö (1878–1960), Finnish politician

As a surname:
Heikki Taneli (born 1980),  Finnish high jumper

Finnish masculine given names